Socialist Party of Andalusia may refer to:
Andalusian Party, known as "Socialist Party of Andalusia" name from 1976 to 1979 and as "Socialist Party of Andalusia–Andalusian Party" from 1979 to 1984.
Socialist Party of Andalusia (2001), split from the Andalusian Party which existed from 2001 to 2011.
Spanish Socialist Workers' Party of Andalusia, the Andalusian branch of the Spanish Socialist Workers' Party.